Lidziya Marozava (Lidiya Aleksandrovna Morozova; born 8 October 1992) is a professional tennis player from Belarus.

Marozava has won three doubles titles on WTA Tour plus two doubles titles on WTA Challenger Tour as well as 21 doubles titles and one singles title on the ITF Circuit. On 25 September 2017, she reached her career-high singles ranking of world No. 468. On 1 October 2018, she peaked at No. 37 in the WTA doubles rankings. 

Playing for the Belarus Fed Cup team, Marozava has a win–loss record of 4–3.

Performance timeline

Doubles

Significant finals

WTA Elite Trophy

Doubles: 1 (runner–up)

WTA career finals

Doubles: 7 (3 titles, 4 runner-ups)

WTA Challenger finals

Doubles: 2 (2 titles)

ITF Circuit finals

Singles: 2 (1 title, 1 runner–up)

Doubles: 36 (21 titles, 15 runner–ups)

Fed Cup/Billie Jean King Cup participation

Singles (0–1)

Doubles (4–2)

Notes

References

External links
 
 
 

1992 births
Living people
Tennis players from Minsk
Belarusian female tennis players
Universiade medalists in tennis
Universiade gold medalists for Belarus
Medalists at the 2015 Summer Universiade